Bazin or Bezin or Bozin or Bezeyn may refer to:
 Bezin, Fars
 Bazin, Zanjan